The  was a class of seven torpedo boat destroyers (TBDs) of the Imperial Japanese Navy. The Harusame class of destroyers were the first destroyers to be built in Japan.

Background
The Harusame-class destroyers were part of the 1894 Imperial Japanese Navy ten-year expansion and modernization plan for based on lessons learned in the First Sino-Japanese War.

In fiscal year 1900, the Imperial Japanese Navy decided to cancel plans for a torpedo boat tender, which freed funds to purchase four additional destroyers. Likewise, in fiscal 1903, the cancellation of six planned utility vessels freed funds to produce an additional three destroyers.

In order to cut costs and to help develop the Japanese shipbuilding industry, it was decided to construct all seven of the new destroyers at Japanese yards. The first four were built at the Yokosuka Naval Arsenal, and the remaining three at the Kure Naval Arsenal.

Design
The Harusame-class ships attempted to incorporate the best features of the existing destroyer designs in the Navy's inventory. The bow design and front half of the vessel was substantially identical to the previous Yarrow-built , whereas the aft section was a copy of the previous Thornycroft-built .

Externally, the design retained the four-smokestacks of the Ikazuchi class, and the improved rudder design of the Akitsuki class. The main design issue was with the coal-fired triple expansion steam engines, which copied the design of the Yarrow water-tube boilers.

Their armament was an incremental improvement to the previous classes, with two (instead of one) QF 12-pounders (on a bandstand on the forecastle and on the quarterdeck), four QF 6-pounder Hotchkiss (two sided abreast the conning tower, and two sided between the funnels) and two single tubes for  torpedoes.

Operational history
All of the Harusame-class destroyers were completed in time to be used in combat during the Russo-Japanese War of 1904–1905, with the final three vessels completed just in time to take part in the crucial final Battle of Tsushima. Hayatori was lost after striking a naval mine during the conflict off of Port Arthur .

Harusame was lost in 1911 after running aground in Matoya Bay in Mie Prefecture, Japan . On 28 August 1912, the remaining five vessels were rated as 3rd-class destroyers and were removed from front line combat service. However, all five served again during World War I, albeit in minor roles.

All five surviving vessels were converted to auxiliary minesweepers on 1 April 1922, but were used for only a year until converted to unarmed utility vessels, and were then subsequently scrapped in 1924 or 1926.

List of Ships

References

Notes

Books

External links

Destroyer classes
 
World War I destroyers of Japan
Russo-Japanese War naval ships of Japan